Park Soo-jeong (born 2 March 1972) was a South Korean female volleyball player. She was part of the South Korea women's national volleyball team.

She competed with the national team at the 2000 Summer Olympics in Sydney, Australia, finishing 8th.

Individual Awards
 1994 FIVB World Championship - "Best Digger"
 1999 AVC Club Volleyball Championship - "Most Valuable Player"
 2000 Summer Olympics - "Best Receiver"

See also
 South Korea at the 2000 Summer Olympics

References

External links
 
 MACAU/SOUTH KOREA: WOMEN'S WORLD GRAND PRIX VOLLEYBALL: RESULTS
https://www.fivb.org/EN/volleyball/competitions/WorldGrandPrix/2012/Teams.asp?Team=KOR
http://www.todor66.com/volleyball/Olympics/Women_OQ_2000.html

1972 births
Living people
South Korean women's volleyball players
Volleyball players at the 1996 Summer Olympics
Volleyball players at the 2000 Summer Olympics
Olympic volleyball players of South Korea
Asian Games medalists in volleyball
Volleyball players at the 1994 Asian Games
Volleyball players at the 1998 Asian Games
Asian Games gold medalists for South Korea
Asian Games silver medalists for South Korea
Medalists at the 1994 Asian Games
Medalists at the 1998 Asian Games